Kentucky's 5th congressional district is a congressional district in the U.S. state of Kentucky. Located in the heart of Appalachia in Southeastern Kentucky, it represents much of the Eastern Kentucky Coalfield. The rural district is the second most impoverished district in the nation and, as of the 2010 U.S. Census, has the highest percentage of White Americans in the nation. Within the district are the economic leading cities of Ashland, Pikeville, Prestonsburg, Middlesboro, Hazard, Jackson, Morehead, London, and Somerset. It is the most rural district in the United States, with 76.49% of its population in rural areas. It has been represented by Republican Hal Rogers since 1981.

With a Cook Partisan Voting Index rating of R+33, it is the most Republican district in Kentucky and tied with Texas's 13th as the second most Republican district in the country. The 5th congressional district is one of the few ancestrally Republican regions south of the Ohio River. Much of the region now in the district strongly supported the Union in the Civil War, and identified with the Republicans after hostilities ceased. By contrast, the northeastern portion of the district borders West Virginia.  Much of this section of the district was once part of the 7th congressional district, long a Democratic stronghold, which was disbanded in 1992 after the 1990 census. Geographically, the district consists of flat land areas to the west, to Appalachia highland mountains to the east and southeast. To the north and northeast of the district are rolling hills that end at the Ohio River. 

Despite the district's strong Republican lean, it features the county of Elliott, which, before being carried by Donald Trump in 2016, had never voted for a Republican president since its founding in 1869, making it the longest Democratic voting streak. Until 2018, when the county gave Rogers 54.6% of its vote, the county had never voted for Rogers, despite him winning at least 65% of the vote in the district in every election except 1992.

Rogers is the dean of the Kentucky delegation and of the entire House of Representatives. Due in part to his seniority, Rogers has served in a number of leadership positions in the chamber.

Characteristics

Until January 1, 2006, Kentucky did not track party affiliation for registered voters who were neither Democratic nor Republican. The Kentucky voter registration card does not explicitly list anything other than Democratic Party, Republican Party, or Other, with the "Other" option having a blank line and no instructions on how to register as something else.

Recent presidential elections

List of members representing the district

Recent election results

2002

2004

2006

2008

2010

2012

2014

2016

2018

2020

2022

See also

Kentucky's congressional districts
List of United States congressional districts

References

 Congressional Biographical Directory of the United States 1774–present

05
Constituencies established in 1803
1803 establishments in Kentucky
Constituencies disestablished in 1933
1933 disestablishments in Kentucky
Constituencies established in 1935
1935 establishments in Kentucky